Emanuele Luzzati (3 June 1921 – 26 January 2007) was an Italian painter, production designer, illustrator, film director and animator. He was nominated for Academy Awards for two of his short films, La gazza ladra (The Thieving Magpie) (1965) and Pulcinella (1973).

Biography
He was born in Genoa and turned to drawing in 1938 when, as a son of a Jew (from the part of his father), his academic studies were interrupted by the introduction of the Fascist racial laws. He moved to Switzerland with his family and studied in Lausanne, where he obtained his degree at the local École des Beaux-Arts. He designed his first production of Solomon and the Queen of Sheba in 1944, a collaboration with his friends Alessandro Fersen, Aldo Trionfo and Guido Lopez. He returned to Italy after the war.

His first work as an animator was the short film I paladini di Francia, together with Giulio Gianini, in 1960.

He provided designs for the London Festival Ballet, the Chicago Opera House, the Vienna Staatsoper and the Glyndebourne Festival, including several Mozart productions and Verdi's Macbeth produced by Michael Hadjimischev in 1972.

Luzzati was interested in tarot symbolism, which he used in scenographies for Fabrizio de André concerts in the 1990s.

One of Luzzati's books (based on a theatre production) was, in the English-language version, Ronald and the Wizard Calico, a fairy tale in verse (translated English).

The Picture Lion paperback edition (William Collins, London, 1973) is a paperback imprint of the Hutchinson Junior Books edition (1969), which credits the English translation to Hutchinson Junior Books, and cites Ugo Mursia Editore 1962 as the Italian language first published version. (The title in Italian is “I Paladini de Francia ovvero il tradimento di Gano di Maganza”, which translates literally as “The Paladins of France or the treachery of Gano of Maganz”.)

This story is an ancient one / That minstrels often tell,
Of battles, love and treachery, / And magic things as well.

The story (the English version, but with the same illustrations as the Italian original) of Ronald and the Wizard Calico, is about the knight, brave Captain Ronald, his valiant charger (a horse) called Fred, and Ronald's golden knights, who are the good guys, guarding the lovely Rosalie in their castle fort.

Nearby, in a “lovely lake” Wizard Calico makes his (good) magic, and flies around on the back of his magic bluebird.
However, “wicked green knights in green / [have] Crept up and hid behind a hill”. They plan to kidnap Rosalie and take her to become “the reluctant wife of Sultan Suhlimann”.

Alas, Gano, a wicked traitor in Ronald's fort, makes his own magic, creating the illusion of another castle on a nearby hill: “At all the open windows there / Stood many lovely girls / With blue eyes and with hair which hung / In long and golden curls. / The damsels called to Ronald's knights / And asked round for tea, / So all the army marched away / And left poor Rosalie”.
Gano opens the gates to the green knights, and rush away with Rosalie. “No doubt you'll have forgotten now / The Wizard Calico, / But luckily for everyone / He saw the traitor go.”

The plot thickens. More magic spells are cast; battle ensues; villains are brought to justice – and “Then Ronald married Rosalie, / As all had hoped he would. / So this tale has a happy end, / As all the best tales should ... / So there it is, a stirring tale, / As at the start I said. / But now it's time to close the book / And quietly go to bed”. (This antepenultimate page includes a gem-like image of Wizard Calico, himself, riding on the back of his magic bluebird, brandishing a flag with the word “END” – or “FINE” in the original Italian. Indeed!)

The attractive and amusing illustrations, by Emanuele Luzatti (the famous Twentieth century Italian-Swiss artist, theatre set and costume designer, film animator, and more), resemble a Punch and Judy booth and puppets, as if drawn and coloured by Georges Rouault, with a black-edged folk-naïve style and stained-glass window-like colours. (The Bayeux tapestry also comes to mind.)

The third-last page in the original Italian is:
Viva Rinaldo, il vincitore, / viva la sposa sua, Biancofiore, / viva Ricardo e i paladini, / viva la chioccia col suoi pulcini, / viva il catello che non c’e piu, / viva il mago Urluberlu.

[Literally, Viva, or Long live, or Hooray for Rinaldo, the winner, viva his bride, Biancifiore, viva Ricardo and his paladins or knights, long live the mother hen with her chicks, long live the chateau and there is more, long live the Urluberlu magician.]
Abbasso i mori, abasso il sultano, morte, supplizio, tortura per Gano, chi vuol esser lieto sia, larga la foglia, lunga la via.
[Literally, Down with the Moors, down with the Sultan; death, torture, torture to Gano, who wants be happy, the leaf wide, long the way.]

The original Italian story was also in simple rhymed verse, and seems to have been about a beautiful maiden called Biancofiore – Whiteflower, or Blanche – and her brave hero, Captain Rinaldo, and Ricardo and his paladins – the term used for Christian knights engaged in Crusades against the Saracens and Moore. Against these good people are the wicked Moors – North African Muslims and Arabs – and their Sultan. The catalyst for victory seems to have been the magician called Urlubulu, who may have had help from a mother hen and her chickens, possibly also magic. Clearly the English translators, using the original illustrations, and the basic rhyme patterns, have slightly simplified the plot, and eliminated the Christians-versus-Muslim-Moors conflict, replacing it with gold versus green.

In other words, we have a retelling, or re-imagining of one of the legends of Roland, the famous French knight, or paladin, who fought the Moors, as they were known, in Spain, and, famously, stopped the conquest of France, as recorded in the verse saga, The Song of Roland, or La Chanson de Roland, and the legendary hero of the Orlando stories, such as Orlando Furioso, retold, or re-imagined for children.

Works in English

Books in English
Chichibio and the crane, New York, Obelensky, 1962
 Ronald and the wizard Calico, New York, Pantheon, 1969, and London, Hutchinson, 1969
 Ali Baba and the forty thieves, New York, Pantheon, 1969
 When it rains...it rains, New York, Rinehart & Winston, 1970 (text by Bill Martin jr.)
 Whistle, Mary, Whistle, New York, Rinehart & Winston, 1970 (text by Bill Martin jr.)
 The magic flute, Oxford, Blackwell, 1971
 The travels of Marco Polo, London, Dent, 1975
 Walking and talking with Yoav, Tel Aviv, Sifriat Poalim, 1976 (text by Michal Snunit)
 Cinderella, London, Bluth, 1981
 Michael and the monster of Jerusalem, Jerusalem, Tower of David Museum, 1989 (text by Meir Shalev)
A Snake, A Flood, A Hidden Baby, Kalaniot Books, 2021 (text by Meir Shalev, English translation by Ilana Kurshan)

Stage designs in English-speaking countries 
The Magic Flute, Glyndebourne Festival Opera, 1963
Macbeth, Glyndebourne Festival Opera, 1964
Carmina Burana, Chicago Lyric Opera, 1965
L'heure espagnole, Chicago Lyric Opera, 1965
A Midsummer Night's Dream, English Opera Group, 1967
Don Giovanni, Glyndebourne Festival Opera, 1967
Die Entführung aus dem Serail, Glyndebourne Festival Opera, 1968
Le Rossignol, Chicago Lyric Opera, 1968
Così fan tutte, Glyndebourne Festival Opera, 1969
Sette canzoni by Gian Francesco Malipiero, Edinburgh International Festival, 1969
El Amor Brujo, Chicago Lyric Opera, 1969
La Cenerentola, Scottish Opera, 1969
Il Turco in Italia, Glyndebourne Festival Opera, 1970
Don Quixote, London Festival Ballet, 1970
L'Italiana in Algeri, Chicago Lyric Opera, 1970
Il mercato di Malmantile by Domenico Cimarosa, Lincoln Center, 1974
Oberon, Opera Theater of Saint Louis, 1988
Candide, Opera Theater of Saint Louis, 1994

References

 Sergio Noberini, Lista cronologica delle scenografie di Emanuele Luzzati in Giorgio Ursini Uršič and Andrea Rauch (editors), Emanuele Luzzati. Scenografo, Genoa, Tormena,1996

External links
  Luzzati Museum in Genoa

Obituary - The Guardian
Obituary - La Repubblica 

1921 births
2007 deaths
20th-century Italian Jews
20th-century Italian male artists
20th-century Italian painters
Italian male painters
Italian scenic designers
Italian illustrators
Italian animators
Italian animated film directors
Jewish painters
People from Alessandria
Italian expatriates in Switzerland